The Pingtang Bridge is a bridge in Pingtang, Guizhou, China and carries the Pingtang Luodian Expressway over the deep Caodu River valley. It was opened to traffic on 30 December 2019.

Structure
The tallest tower is  shorter than France's Millau Viaduct, which has a similar structure to the Pingtang Bridge. The bridge cost 1.5 billion yuan (about 215 million U.S. dollars) to build.

See also
List of highest bridges
List of tallest bridges
List of longest cable-stayed bridge spans

References

External links
Pintang Bridge Highest bridges

Road bridges in China
Cable-stayed bridges in China
Bridges in Guizhou
Bridges completed in 2019